Minge may refer to:

Places
Mingə, Azerbaijan
Mingė, Lithuania

Slang uses
Vulva (in Commonwealth English)
Female pubic hair
Midge, an insect (in U.S. English)

Other uses
Minge (surname), people so named
Revolutionary Committee of the Kuomintang, a minor political party in China

See also
Ming (disambiguation)
Menzies (disambiguation)